Blye may refer to:

In places
Blye, commune in the Jura department in Franche-Comté in eastern France

In people
In first/middle names
Blye Pagon Faust, American film producer
Judy Blye Wilson, American casting director 

In surnames
Birdie Blye (1871–1935), American pianist
Maggie Blye (1942–2016), American actress
Ron Blye (born 1943), American football player
Sylvester Blye (born 1938), American basketball player

In fiction
"Blye, K., Part 2", 17th episode of the third season of the American crime drama television series NCIS: Los Angeles
Kensi Blye, fictional character in the show NCIS: Los Angeles

See also
 Bly (disambiguation)